Rodney Strachan (born October 16, 1955) is an American former competition swimmer and Olympic champion.  He competed at the 1976 Summer Olympics in Montreal, Quebec, where he received a gold medal in the 400-meter individual medley event.  He received a silver medal in the same event at the 1973 World Aquatics Championships in Belgrade.

Strachan held the long course world record in the 400-meter individual medley (4:23.68) from July 1976 to August 1978.

See also
 List of Olympic medalists in swimming (men)
 List of World Aquatics Championships medalists in swimming (men)
 World record progression 400 metres individual medley

References

External links
 

1955 births
Living people
American male medley swimmers
World record setters in swimming
Olympic gold medalists for the United States in swimming
Swimmers from Santa Monica, California
Swimmers at the 1976 Summer Olympics
USC Trojans men's swimmers
World Aquatics Championships medalists in swimming
Medalists at the 1976 Summer Olympics
20th-century American people